Kristi Michele Mathieson is an American politician from Maine. She is the representative for Maine House District 1. She is on the Health Coverage, Insurance and Financial Services committee. Mathieson is also a registered dietitian.

References

Year of birth missing (living people)
Living people
People from Kittery, Maine
University of New Hampshire alumni
Women state legislators in Maine
Democratic Party members of the Maine House of Representatives
21st-century American women